Robin Ian MacDonald Dunbar  (born 28 June 1947)  is a British anthropologist and evolutionary psychologist and a specialist in primate behaviour. He is currently head of the Social and Evolutionary Neuroscience Research Group in the Department of Experimental Psychology at the University of Oxford. He is best known for formulating Dunbar's number, a measurement of the "cognitive limit to the number of individuals with whom any one person can maintain stable relationships".

Education

Dunbar, the son of an engineer, was educated at Magdalen College School, Brackley. He went on to study at Magdalen College, Oxford, where his teachers included Niko Tinbergen; he completed his Bachelor of Arts in Psychology and Philosophy in 1969. Dunbar then went on to the Department of Psychology of the University of Bristol and completed his PhD in 1974 on the social organisation of the gelada, Theropithecus gelada, a monkey that is a close relative to baboons.

He spent two years as a freelance science writer. Dunbar told BBC Radio interviewer Jim Al-Khalili in The Life Scientific in 2019 that he "got his first real job" only at the age of 40.

Academic career
Dunbar's academic and research career includes the University of Bristol, University of Cambridge from 1977 until 1982, and University College London from 1987 until 1994. In 1994, Dunbar became Professor of Evolutionary Psychology at University of Liverpool, but he left Liverpool in 2007 to take up the post of Director of the Institute of Cognitive and Evolutionary Anthropology, University of Oxford.

Dunbar was formerly co-director of the British Academy Centenary Research Project (BACRP) "From Lucy to Language: The Archaeology of the Social Brain" and was involved in the BACRP "Identifying the Universal Religious Repertoire".

Digital versions of selected published articles authored or co-authored by him are available from the University of Liverpool Evolutionary Psychology and Behavioural Ecology Research Group.

In 2015, Dunbar was awarded the Huxley Memorial Medal—established in 1900 in memory of Thomas Henry Huxley—for services to anthropology by the Council of the Royal Anthropological Institute of Great Britain and Ireland, the highest honour at the disposal of the RAI. Dunbar is also a Humanists UK Distinguished Supporter of Humanism.

Awards and honours
 2015, Huxley Memorial Medal, Royal Anthropological Institute of Great Britain and Ireland
 1998, Elected Fellow of the British Academy (FBA)
 1994, ad hominem Chair, Psychology, University of Liverpool

In popular culture
Dunbar's work is mentioned in The Big Bang Theory, Season 4, Episode 20 ("The Herb Garden Germination"), when Amy Farrah Fowler is talking with Sheldon Cooper while listening to a lecture by Brian Greene (2011).

Dunbar is a featured character in the adaptation of Yuval Noah Harari's book Sapiens: A Brief History of Humankind into graphic novel (2020).

Dunbar's work is described in the epilogue of Blake Crouch's novel Upgrade (2022).

References

Published books
 Dunbar. 1984. Reproductive Decisions: An Economic Analysis of Gelada Baboon Social Strategies. Princeton University Press 
 Dunbar. 1987. Demography and Reproduction. In Primate Societies. Smuts, B.B., Cheney, D.L., Seyfarth, R.M., Wrangham, R.W., Struhsaker, T.T. (eds). Chicago & London:University of Chicago Press. pp. 240–249 
 Dunbar. 1988. Primate Social Systems. Chapman Hall and Yale University Press 
 Foley, Robert & Dunbar, Robin (14 October 1989). "Beyond the bones of contention". New Scientist Vol.124 (No.1686) pp. 21–25.
 Dunbar. 1996. The Trouble with Science. Harvard University Press. 
 Dunbar (ed.). 1995. Human Reproductive Decisions. Macmillan 
 Dunbar. 1997. Grooming, Gossip and the Evolution of Language. Harvard University Press. 
 Runciman, Maynard Smith, & Dunbar (eds.). 1997. Evolution of Culture and Language in Primates and Humans. Oxford University Press.
 Dunbar, Knight, & Power (eds.). 1999. The Evolution of Culture. Edinburgh University Press 
 Dunbar & Barrett. 2000. Cousins. BBC Worldwide: London 
 Cowlishaw & Dunbar. 2000. Primate Conservation Biology. University of Chicago Press 
 Barrett, Dunbar & Lycett. 2002. Human Evolutionary Psychology. London: Palgrave 
 Dunbar, Barrett & Lycett. 2005. Evolutionary Psychology, a Beginner's Guide. Oxford: One World Books 
 Dunbar. 2004. The Human Story. London: Faber and Faber 
 Dunbar. 2010. How Many Friends Does One Person Need?: Dunbar's Number and Other Evolutionary Quirks. London: Faber & Faber  (paper)
 Dunbar. 2014. Human Evolution. Pelican Books 
 Dunbar. 2016.  Human Evolution: Our Brains and Behavior (Illustrated) 
 Dunbar. 2021. Friends: Understanding the Power of our Most Important Relationships. Little, Brown and Company 
 Dunbar. 2022. How Religion Evolved: And Why It Endures. Pelican Books

External links

 The Human Behaviour and Evolution Society
 What Makes us Human Pulse Project Podcast: What Makes us Human? (22 October 2008, Oxford)
 University of Oxford Department of Experimental Psychology profile

British evolutionary biologists
Evolutionary psychologists
Primatologists
Human evolution theorists
1947 births
Living people
Linguists from the United Kingdom
British anthropologists
Anthropology writers
Alumni of Magdalen College, Oxford
Academics of University College London
Fellows of the Royal Anthropological Institute of Great Britain and Ireland
Fellows of the British Academy
Fellows of Magdalen College, Oxford